Kafr Battikh  is a Syrian village located in Saraqib Nahiyah in Idlib District, Idlib.  According to the Syria Central Bureau of Statistics (CBS), Kafr Battikh had a population of 3166 in the 2004 census.

History 
During the Syrian Civil War, in 2012 the village was captured from the Syrian government by rebel forces. On 8 July 2019, the village was struck by Russian airstrikes, which were targeting Hay'at Tahrir al-Sham's supply lines in the area. On 30 January 2020, the village was liberated by government forces, advancing from Ma'arrat al-Nu'man towards Saraqib during the 5th Northwestern Syria offensive.

References 

Populated places in Idlib District